Ghulam Fatima (born 5 October 1995) is a Pakistani cricketer who plays as a right-arm leg break bowler. She appeared in three One Day Internationals and two Twenty20 Internationals for Pakistan in 2017 and 2018. She has played domestic cricket for Higher Education Commission and State Bank of Pakistan.

She made her One Day International debut against South Africa in the 2017 Women's Cricket World Cup Qualifier on 7 February 2017. She made her Twenty20 International debut against Sri Lanka on 28 March 2018. In January 2022, she was named in Pakistan's team for the 2022 Women's Cricket World Cup in New Zealand.

References

External links
 
 

1995 births
Living people
Cricketers from Sialkot
Pakistani women cricketers
Pakistan women One Day International cricketers
Pakistan women Twenty20 International cricketers
Higher Education Commission women cricketers
State Bank of Pakistan women cricketers